The Ministry of Cooperatives ( administers Burma's agricultural cooperative policies.

The ministry was founded as the Ministry of State Cooperative and Commodity Distribution on 5 April 1951. It was merged with Ministry of Civil Supply Services on 26 March 1962 to form the Ministry of Civil Supply and Cooperatives, and separated again on 18 June 1965.

The Ministry is currently led by Dr. Aung Thu, who was appointed by President  U Htin Kyaw under the Ministry of Agriculture, Livestock and Irrigation in May 2016.

See also
 Cabinet of Burma

References

External links
 Official website

Cooperatives
Myanmar
Ministries established in 1951
1951 establishments in Burma